Abertown is an unincorporated community located within Sandyston Township in Sussex County, New Jersey, United States.

References

Unincorporated communities in Sussex County, New Jersey
Sandyston Township, New Jersey
Unincorporated communities in New Jersey